The 1984–85 season was the 61st season in the existence of AEK Athens F.C. and the 26th consecutive season in the top flight of Greek football. They competed in the Alpha Ethniki and the Greek Cup. The season began on 23 September 1984 and finished on 16 June 1985.

Overview

In the summer of 1984, Zafiropoulos returned to the spotlight of the administrative activities of the club and took over the presidency. The team continued to be in a state of competitive change. Petros Ravousis, one of the team's flags for 12 years, left and continued at Levadiakos, Lakis Stergioudas moved to PAOK and Takis Nikoloudis to Apollon Kalamarias, from the previous December. AEK were strengthened with the Swedish striker, Håkan Sandberg from Göteborg and Czech midfielder, František Štambachr. From the Greek market, AEK acquired Nikos Pias, Theologis Papadopoulos Andreas Votsidis and Makis Chatzis. The coach was Václav Halama, a Czech by origin, with a presence on the bench of Austria Vien and Munich 1860. Zafiropoulos hired him with great ambition, while to the crowd he was presented as a coach that mastered the locker rooms, however, these expectations were shortly refuted.

AEK did not start well, although they showed signs of a strongly aggressive team inside the field. In the first 10 games, the team gathered 4 wins, 5 draws and 1 defeat, while away from home they managed to win only once. In the Greek Cup, AEK was drawn to face the team of Lamia, away, at the first round. In the "dry" stadium of the home team, AEK experienced one of the most shameful and unexpected eliminations in the history of the institution. The team did not treat the match with seriousness and at the 20th minute were behind with a goal by Mantzikos. In the remaining minutes AEK players did not manage to do anything resulting in their elimination from the tournament.

At the end of the 10th matchday Zafeiropoulos proceeded to replace Halama, who had lost control of the locker room, with the former coach of Aris, Antonis Georgiadis. However, the team made changes also in their roster. In December, Štambachr left for Apollon Athens, due to the fact that he occupied a foreigner's position and Paraprastanitis for Egaleo. On the other hand, the president of the "yellow bkacks" performed a great deal as he dressed the Hungarian Márton Esterházy in AEK Athens' colors. The Hungarian ace quickly proved his value, as together with Thomas Mavros and Håkan Sandberg composed a "magic" triplet for the double-headed eagle. The team played very offensive football for the season while Thomas Mavros finished as the league's top scorer, with 27 goals, while together with Sandberg scored 42 of the total 58 goals of the club. Nevertheless, although AEK finished the league with only 3 defeats all of them away from home, remained at third place in the league, equaling the second Panathinaikos 3 points behind PAOK.

Players

Squad information

NOTE: The players are the ones that have been announced by the AEK Athens' press release. No edits should be made unless a player arrival or exit is announced. Updated 30 June 1985, 23:59 UTC+3.

Transfers

In

Summer

Winter

Out

Summer

Winter

Overall transfer activity

Expenditure
Summer:  ₯25,000,000

Winter:  ₯0

Total:  ₯25,000,000

Income
Summer:  ₯0

Winter:  ₯0

Total:  ₯0

Net Totals
Summer:  ₯25,000,000

Winter:  ₯0

Total:  ₯25,000,000

Pre-season and friendlies

Alpha Ethniki

League table

Results summary

Results by Matchday

Fixtures

Greek Cup

Statistics

Squad statistics

! colspan="9" style="background:#FFDE00; text-align:center" | Goalkeepers
|-

! colspan="9" style="background:#FFDE00; color:black; text-align:center;"| Defenders
|-

! colspan="9" style="background:#FFDE00; color:black; text-align:center;"| Midfielders
|-

! colspan="9" style="background:#FFDE00; color:black; text-align:center;"| Forwards
|-

! colspan="9" style="background:#FFDE00; color:black; text-align:center;"| Left during Winter Transfer Window
|-

|}

Disciplinary record

|-
! colspan="14" style="background:#FFDE00; text-align:center" | Goalkeepers

|-
! colspan="14" style="background:#FFDE00; color:black; text-align:center;"| Defenders

|-
! colspan="14" style="background:#FFDE00; color:black; text-align:center;"| Midfielders

|-
! colspan="14" style="background:#FFDE00; color:black; text-align:center;"| Forwards

|-
! colspan="14" style="background:#FFDE00; color:black; text-align:center;"| Left during Winter Transfer Window

|}

References

External links
AEK Athens F.C. Official Website

AEK Athens F.C. seasons
AEK Athens